William Guthrie may refer to:
William Guthrie (boxer) (born 1967), American boxer
William Guthrie (historian) (1708–1770), Scottish writer and journalist
William Guthrie (politician) (1884–1954), Canadian politician
William Guthrie (minister) (1620–1665), Scottish Presbyterian minister and author
William Dameron Guthrie (1859–1935), American lawyer
W. K. C. Guthrie (William Keith Chambers Guthrie, 1906-1981), Scottish classical scholar and philosophy professor
William Norman Guthrie (1868–1944), American clergyman
William Tyrone Guthrie (1900–1971), English theatre director